Charles Edward Peter Neil Wood, 3rd Earl of Halifax,  (born 14 March 1944), is a British peer and Conservative politician.

Background
Lord Halifax is the third child and only son of Charles Wood, 2nd Earl of Halifax, a grandson of Edward Wood, 1st Earl of Halifax, Viceroy of India and Foreign Secretary. His mother, Ruth Wood (née Primrose), The Countess of Halifax, was a daughter of Neil Primrose, and a granddaughter of Archibald Primrose, 5th Earl of Rosebery, Prime Minister of the United Kingdom, and Edward Stanley, 17th Earl of Derby.

He was brought up at Swinford Paddocks, Newmarket, and educated at Eton and Christ Church, Oxford.

Career
As Peter Wood, he unsuccessfully contested Dearne Valley as a Conservative candidate at the February general election of 1974 and the October general election of the same year. On 19 March 1980, he succeeded to the titles of 3rd Earl of Halifax, 7th Baronet Wood, of Barnsley in the County of York, 5th Viscount Halifax of Monk Bretton, in the West Riding of the County of Yorkshire, and 3rd Baron Irwin, of Kirby Underdale in the County of York.

Lord Halifax held the office of Deputy Lieutenant (D.L.) of Humberside between 1983 and 1996. He held the office of Justice of the Peace (J.P.) for Wilton Beacon in 1985 and the office of High Steward of York Minster in 1988. Wood held the office of Vice-Lord-Lieutenant of the East Riding, Yorkshire, in 1996. He is a Knight of St John
and JP.

Lord Halifax is a non-executive director of Hambros Bank, the Vice-Chairman of Christie, Manson & Woods (the European Division of Christie's international fine arts auctioneers), and a director of Yorkshire Post Newspapers Ltd. 
He serves as a Board Governor for The Pocklington School Foundation. 
He is the President of the Leeds Art Collections Fund, the Vice President of the Yorkshire Society, and a member of the Board of Directors of Jockey Club Estates. The Earl and The Countess of Halifax are active members of the Jockey Club.

Family
In 1976, Lord Halifax (then Lord Irwin) (who had once been minded for a potential husband of Princess Anne) married Camilla Younger, of the Scottish brewing family, former wife of Richard Parker Bowles (married in 1973 and divorced in 1976), a younger brother of Andrew Parker Bowles, first husband of Camilla, Queen Consort. Andrew also had a dalliance with Princess Anne. The Countess of Halifax and The Queen Consort are former sisters-in-law.

Lord and Lady Halifax have a son and a daughter:

James Charles Wood, Lord Irwin (born 24 August 1977), heir apparent to the earldom, married Georgia E. Clarkson, Lady Irwin, daughter of Patrick Robert James Clarkson, QC (son of Cmdr Robert Anthony Clarkson, LVO, RN), and Bridget Cecilia Doyne, on 14 October 2006 at Church of St. John the Evangelist, Sutton Veny in the county of Wiltshire, England; they have issue:
Hon. Rex Patrick Wood (born 12 August 2010)
Hon. Audrey Nancy Wood (born 23 January 2013)
Lady Joanna Victoria Wood (born 15 January 1980)

The Countess of Halifax also has a daughter from her first marriage with Richard Eustace Parker Bowles:
Emma Parker Bowles (born 1974).

The Earl and Countess of Halifax live on the 20,000-acre family estate Garrowby Hall near Garrowby, East Riding of Yorkshire. 
Lady Halifax is the national president of Macmillan Cancer Support.

References

External links

Burke's Peerage

1944 births
Living people
People educated at Eton College
Alumni of Christ Church, Oxford
Wood family
Knights of Justice of the Order of St John
Deputy Lieutenants of the East Riding of Yorkshire
British people of German-Jewish descent
British racehorse owners and breeders
Earls of Halifax
Halifax